Maymak is a village in the Talas Region of Kyrgyzstan. It is part of the Kara-Buura District. Its population was 827 in 2021. Until 2012 it was an urban-type settlement.

Population

References

Populated places in Talas Region